Heikki Liimatainen (14 March 1894 – 24 December 1980) was a Finnish male athlete who competed mainly in the Cross Country Team.

He competed for Finland in the 1920 Summer Olympics held in Antwerp, Belgium in the Cross Country where he won the bronze medal and helped the Finnish team of multiple gold medalist Paavo Nurmi and Teodor Koskenniemi. He returned four years later to the 1924 Summer Olympics held in Paris, France in the Cross Country Team where he again won the gold medal with the gold and silver medal winners Paavo Nurmi and Ville Ritola

References

External links

1894 births
1980 deaths
People from Karstula
Finnish male long-distance runners
Olympic gold medalists for Finland
Olympic bronze medalists for Finland
Athletes (track and field) at the 1920 Summer Olympics
Athletes (track and field) at the 1924 Summer Olympics
Olympic athletes of Finland
Medalists at the 1924 Summer Olympics
Medalists at the 1920 Summer Olympics
Olympic gold medalists in athletics (track and field)
Olympic bronze medalists in athletics (track and field)
Olympic cross country runners
Sportspeople from Central Finland
19th-century Finnish people
20th-century Finnish people